Premančan is a village in the City Municipality of Koper in the Littoral region of Slovenia on the border with Italy.

References

External links
Premančan on Geopedia

Populated places in the City Municipality of Koper